is a Japanese politician who served as Minister of Labor and as a member of the House of Representatives in the Diet of Japan.

Yamaguchi was first elected to the House of Representatives in the 1967 general election and served ten consecutive terms in the Diet, holding his seat until the 1996 general election. He served as labor minister from 1984 to 1985 in the cabinet of Prime Minister Yasuhiro Nakasone. During his time in the Diet, he frequently appeared in the media and was dubbed the "Ushiwakamaru of politics."

In 1994, Yamaguchi persuaded the heads of Tokyo Kyowa Credit Association and Anzen Credit Bank to arrange illegal loans for companies controlled by Yamaguchi and his family. He was arrested in December 1995 and held in prison for a year pending trial. In 1996, he was found guilty of breach of trust, embezzlement, fraud and perjury, and sentenced to four years in prison. He appealed the verdict to the Tokyo High Court, and told reporters in 2002 that he was considering a return to office in 2004; his appeal was rejected in February 2003. He was taken to prison in March 2007 to serve the remaining 3.5 years of his term.

Following his release, in 2015, Yamaguchi distributed pamphlets to members of the Diet calling for former Prime Minister Yoshiro Mori to resign as head of the 2020 Summer Olympics organizing committee, causing a stir in the political world as Yamaguchi and Mori had been acquaintances since Mori was still a student.

He placed eleventh out of twenty-one candidates.

References

|-

|-

|-

|-

|-

1940 births
Labor ministers of Japan
Liberal Democratic Party (Japan) politicians
Living people
Meiji University alumni
Members of the House of Representatives (Japan)
New Frontier Party (Japan) politicians
20th-century Japanese politicians
Politicians from Saitama Prefecture
Tokyo gubernatorial candidates